The following is a list of ballparks previously used by professional baseball teams.

In addition to the current National (NL) and American (AL) leagues, Major League Baseball recognizes four short-lived other leagues as "major" for at least some portion of their histories; three of them played only in the 19th century, while a fourth played two years in the 1910s. These leagues are the American Association (AA), 1882–1891; the Union Association (UA), 1884; the Players' League (PL), 1890; and the Federal League (FL), 1914–1915. This list includes all ballparks that served as regular home fields for teams throughout all six circuits' histories as major leagues.

All playing fields are natural grass unless otherwise noted.

See also

 List of current Major League Baseball stadiums
 List of Major League Baseball spring training stadiums
 List of U.S. baseball stadiums by capacity
 List of U.S. stadiums by capacity
 List of baseball parks by capacity
 List of current National Football League stadiums
 List of National Hockey League arenas
 List of Major League Soccer stadiums
 List of Major League Lacrosse stadiums
 List of National Basketball Association arenas

References

 01
Stadiums
Lists of baseball stadiums in the United States